Frantz Omar Fanon (20 July 1925 – 6 December 1961), also known as Ibrahim Frantz Fanon, was a Marxist, French West Indian psychiatrist and political philosopher from the French colony of Martinique (today a French department). His works have become influential in the fields of post-colonial studies, critical theory, and Marxism. As well as being an intellectual, Fanon was a political radical, Pan-Africanist, and Marxist humanist concerned with the psychopathology of colonization and the human, social, and cultural consequences of decolonization.

In the course of his work as a physician and psychiatrist, Fanon supported the Algerian War of independence from France and was a member of the Algerian National Liberation Front. Fanon has been described as "the most influential anticolonial thinker of his time". For more than five decades, the life and works of Fanon have inspired national liberation movements and other radical political organizations in Palestine, Sri Lanka, South Africa, and the United States. He formulated a model for community psychology, believing that many mental health patients would do better if they were integrated into their family and community instead of being treated with institutionalized care. He also helped found the field of institutional psychotherapy while working at Saint-Alban under Francois Tosquelles and Jean Oury.

Biography

Early life 
Frantz Fanon was born on the Caribbean island of Martinique, which was then a French colony and is now a French single territorial collectivity. His father, Félix Casimir Fanon, was a descendant of African slaves, and worked as a customs agent. His mother, Eléanore Médélice, was of Afro-Martinican and white Alsatian descent, and worked as a shopkeeper. Frantz was the third of four sons in a family of eight children. Two of them died young, including his sister Gabrielle, with whom Frantz was very close. His family was socio-economically middle-class. They could afford the fees for the Lycée Schoelcher, at the time the most prestigious high school in Martinique, where Fanon came to admire one of the school's teachers, poet and writer Aimé Césaire. Fanon left Martinique in 1943, when he was 18 years old, in order to join the Free French forces.

Martinique and World War II 
After France fell to the Nazis in 1940, Vichy French naval troops were blockaded on Martinique. Forced to remain on the island, French sailors took over the government from the Martiniquan people and established a collaborationist Vichy regime. In the face of economic distress and isolation under the blockade, they instituted an oppressive regime; Fanon described them as taking off their masks and behaving like "authentic racists". Residents made many complaints of harassment and sexual misconduct by the sailors. The abuse of the Martiniquan people by the French Navy influenced Fanon, reinforcing his feelings of alienation and his disgust with colonial racism. At the age of seventeen, Fanon fled the island as a "dissident" (a term used for Frenchmen joining Gaullist forces), traveling to Dominica to join the Free French Forces. After three attempts, he made it to Dominica, but it was too late to enlist. After the pro-Vichy Robert regime was deposed in Martinique in June 1943, Fanon returned to Fort-de-France to join the newly created, all black .

He enlisted in the Free French army and joined an Allied convoy that reached Casablanca. He was later transferred to an army base at Béjaïa on the Kabylia coast of Algeria. Fanon left Algeria from Oran and served in France, notably in the battles of Alsace. In 1944 he was wounded at Colmar and received the Croix de guerre. When the Nazis were defeated and Allied forces crossed the Rhine into Germany along with photojournalists, Fanon's regiment was "bleached" of all non-white soldiers. Fanon and his fellow Afro-Caribbean soldiers were sent to Toulon (Provence). Later, they were transferred to Normandy to await repatriation.

During the war, Fanon was exposed to more white European racism. For example, European women liberated by black soldiers often preferred to dance with fascist Italian prisoners, rather than fraternize with their liberators.

In 1945, Fanon returned to Martinique. He lasted a short time there. He worked for the parliamentary campaign of his friend and mentor Aimé Césaire, who would be a major influence in his life. Césaire ran on the communist ticket as a parliamentary delegate from Martinique to the first National Assembly of the Fourth Republic. Fanon stayed long enough to complete his baccalaureate and then went to France, where he studied medicine and psychiatry.

France
Fanon was educated in Lyon, where he also studied literature, drama and philosophy, sometimes attending Merleau-Ponty's lectures. During this period, he wrote three plays, of which two survive. After qualifying as a psychiatrist in 1951, Fanon did a residency in psychiatry at Saint-Alban-sur-Limagnole under the radical Catalan psychiatrist François Tosquelles, who invigorated Fanon's thinking by emphasizing the role of culture in psychopathology.

In 1948 Fanon started a relationship with Michelle, a medical student, who soon became pregnant. He left her for an 18-year-old high school student, Josie, whom he married in 1952. At urging of his friends he later recognized his daughter, Mireille, although he did not have contact with her.

In France while completing his residency, Fanon wrote and published his first book, Black Skin, White Masks (1952), an analysis of the negative psychological effects of colonial subjugation upon black people. Originally, the manuscript was the doctoral dissertation, submitted at Lyon, entitled "Essay on the Disalienation of the Black", which was a response to the racism that Fanon experienced while studying psychiatry and medicine at university in Lyon; the rejection of the dissertation prompted Fanon to publish it as a book. For his doctor of philosophy degree, he submitted another dissertation of narrower scope and different subject. Left-wing philosopher Francis Jeanson, leader of the pro-Algerian independence Jeanson network, read Fanon's manuscript and as a senior book editor at Éditions du Seuil in Paris, gave the book its new title and wrote its epilogue.

After receiving Fanon's manuscript at Seuil, Jeanson invited him to an editorial meeting. Amid Jeanson's praise of the book, Fanon exclaimed: "Not bad for a nigger, is it?" Insulted, Jeanson dismissed Fanon from his office. Later, Jeanson learned that his response had earned him the writer's lifelong respect, and Fanon acceded to Jeanson's suggestion that the book be entitled Black Skin, White Masks.

In the book, Fanon described the unfair treatment of black people in France and how they were disapproved of by white people. Black people also had a sense of inferiority when facing white people. Fanon believed that even though they could speak French, they could not fully integrate into the life and environment of white people. (See further discussion of Black Skin, White Masks under Work, below.)

Algeria

After his residency, Fanon practised psychiatry at Pontorson, near Mont Saint-Michel, for another year and then (from 1953) in Algeria. He was chef de service at the  Blida-Joinville Psychiatric Hospital in Algeria. He worked there until his deportation in January 1957.

Fanon's methods of treatment started evolving, particularly by beginning socio-therapy to connect with his patients' cultural backgrounds. He also trained nurses and interns. Following the outbreak of the Algerian revolution in November 1954, Fanon joined the Front de Libération Nationale, after having made contact with Dr Pierre Chaulet at Blida in 1955. Working at a French hospital in Algeria, Fanon became responsible for treating the psychological distress of the French soldiers and officers who carried out torture in order to suppress anti-colonial resistance. Additionally, Fanon was also responsible for treating Algerian torture victims.

Fanon made extensive trips across Algeria, mainly in the Kabylia region, to study the cultural and psychological life of Algerians. His lost study of "The marabout of Si Slimane" is an example. These trips were also a means for clandestine activities, notably in his visits to the ski resort of Chrea which hid an FLN base.

Joining the FLN and exile from Algeria

By summer 1956 Fanon realized that he could no longer continue to support French efforts, even indirectly via his hospital work. In November he submitted his "Letter of resignation to the Resident Minister", which later became an influential text of its own in anti-colonialist circles.

There comes a time when silence becomes dishonesty. The ruling intentions of personal existence are not in accord with the permanent assaults on the most commonplace values. For many months my conscience has been the seat of unpardonable debates. And the conclusion is the determination not to despair of man, in other words, of myself. The decision I have reached is that I cannot continue to bear a responsibility at no matter what cost, on the false pretext that there is nothing else to be done.

Shortly afterwards, Fanon was expelled from Algeria and moved to Tunis where he joined the FLN openly. He was part of the editorial collective of Al Moudjahid, for which he wrote until the end of his life. He also served as Ambassador to Ghana for the Provisional Algerian Government (GPRA). He attended conferences in Accra, Conakry, Addis Ababa, Leopoldville, Cairo and Tripoli. Many of his shorter writings from this period were collected posthumously in the book Toward the African Revolution. In this book Fanon reveals war tactical strategies; in one chapter he discusses how to open a southern front to the war and how to run the supply lines.

Upon his return to Tunis, after his exhausting trip across the Sahara to open a Third Front, Fanon was diagnosed with leukemia. He went to the Soviet Union for treatment and experienced some remission of his illness. When he came back to Tunis once again, he dictated his testament The Wretched of the Earth. When he was not confined to his bed, he delivered lectures to Armée de Libération Nationale (ALN) officers at Ghardimao on the Algerian-Tunisian border. He traveled to Rome for a three-day meeting with Jean-Paul Sartre who had greatly influenced his work. Sartre agreed to write a preface to Fanon's last book, The Wretched of the Earth.

Death and aftermath

With his health declining, Fanon's comrades urged him to seek treatment in the U.S. as his Soviet doctors had suggested. In 1961, the CIA arranged a trip under the promise of stealth for further leukemia treatment at a National Institutes of Health facility. During his time in the United States, Fanon was handled by CIA agent Oliver Iselin. As Lewis R. Gordon points out, the circumstances of Fanon's stay are somewhat disputed: "What has become orthodoxy, however, is that he was kept in a hotel without treatment for several days until he contracted pneumonia."

Fanon subsequently died from double pneumonia in Bethesda, Maryland, on 6 December 1961 after finally having begun his leukemia treatment. He had been admitted under the name of "Ibrahim Fanon", a Libyan nom de guerre he had assumed in order to enter a hospital in Rome after being wounded in Morocco during a mission for the Algerian National Liberation Front. He was buried in Algeria after lying in state in Tunisia. Later, his body was moved to a martyrs' (Chouhada) graveyard at Aïn Kerma in eastern Algeria.

Frantz Fanon was survived by his French wife, Josie (née Dublé), their son, Olivier Fanon, and his daughter from a previous relationship, Mireille Fanon-Mendès France. Josie Fanon later became disillusioned with the government and after years of depression and drinking died by suicide in Algiers in 1989. Mireille became a professor of international law and conflict resolution and serves as president of the Frantz Fanon Foundation. Olivier became president of the Frantz Fanon National Association, which was created in Algiers in 2012.

Work

Black Skin, White Masks 

Black Skin, White Masks was first published in French as Peau noire, masques blancs in 1952 and is one of Fanon's most important works. In Black Skin, White Masks, Fanon psychoanalyzes the oppressed Black person who is perceived to have to be a lesser creature in the White world that they live in, and studies how they navigate the world through a performance of White-ness. Particularly in discussing language, he talks about how the black person's use of a colonizer's language is seen by the colonizer as predatory, and not transformative, which in turn may create insecurity in the black's consciousness. He recounts that he himself faced many admonitions as a child for using Creole French instead of "real French", or "French French", that is, "white" French. Ultimately, he concludes that "mastery of language [of the white/colonizer] for the sake of recognition as white reflects a dependency that subordinates the black's humanity".

"The Negro and Language" 

Chapter 1 of Black Skin, White Masks is entitled "The Negro and Language". In this chapter, Fanon discusses how colored people were perceived by the whites. He says that the black man has two dimensions: One with his fellows, the other with the white man. A Negro behaves differently with a white man than with another Negro. Fanon claimed that whether this self-division is a direct result of colonialist subjugation is beyond question. To speak a language is to take on a world, a culture. The Antilles Negro who wants to be white will be the whiter as he gains greater mastery of the cultural tool that language is. Fanon concludes his theorizing by saying: "Historically, it must be understood that the Negro wants to speak French because it is the key that can open doors which were still barred to him fifty years ago. In the Antilles Negro who comes within this study we find a quest for subtleties, for refinements of language—so many further means of proving to himself that he has measured up to the culture."

"The Woman of Color and the White Man" 

Chapter 2 of Black Skin, White Masks is entitled “The woman of color and the white man”. The focus of the chapter is on the extent to which authentic love between women of color and European males is hindered by unconscious tensions. It discusses how a feeling of inferiority has manifested in women of color because of colonialism. Fanon introduces the reader to the cases of Mayotte Capécia and Nini. Mayotte Capécia is a black woman who Fanon claims has idealized whiteness. She wants above all to be with a white man, and strives to be as close to communities of white people as possible. Fanon also discusses how mulatto women see themselves as superior to black men. This is the case with the black man Mactar´s love letter to Nini (a mulatto woman), where he acknowledges his inferiority as a black man, but argues that his devotion to her is reason enough to choose him. The idealization of whiteness both in white people and people of color is discussed.

"The Man of Color and the White Woman" 

Chapter 3 of Black Skin, White Masks is entitled “The man of color and the white woman”. In this chapter Fanon discusses the desire of the black man to be white. Firstly by telling the story of the Antillean man who upon arrival has one goal: to sleep with a white woman. For the black man, an unconscious need to prove that their worth is similar to the white man is fulfilled through sexual interaction with the white woman. Fanon then analyzes the story of Jean Veneuse written by René Maran, a work believed to be autobiographic. Jean Veneuse is a black man from the Antilles living in Bourdeaux. He is a part of the social and cultural elite and falls in love with a white woman. He is aware of the stereotype of the black man´s desire to sleep with a white woman and is therefore hesitant to become one of them thereby confirming the stereotype. Fanon goes on to explore the psychodynamics of Venuese´s personality type – the negative-aggressive abandonment-neurotic, and what role his personality type has in his romantic interactions. The negative-aggressive abandonment-neurotic displays a “fear of showing oneself as one actually is” resulting from a doubt that one can be loved as one is, as they had experiences of abandonment in childhood. Towards the end of the chapter, Fanon emphasizes the lack of generalizability for the findings on Jean Veneuse to the experiences of all black men in France, as the course of his development to a great extent is also part of his personality type. As Fanon writes “… we would like to think that we have discouraged any attempt to connect the failure of Jean Veneuse to the amount of melanin in his epidermis.”

"The So-Called Dependency Complex of the Colonized" 

Chapter 4 of Black Skin, White Masks is entitled “The So-Called Dependency Complex of the Colonized”. The chapter envelopes Fanon´s critique of Octave Mannoni´s book “Prospero and Caliban: The Psychology of Colonization”. Mannoni launches a theory that the colonized Malagasies suffer from an inferiority complex which further leads to a dependency complex. Fanon criticizes the implication that this inferiority complex is innate in the colonized, and argues for the effect of human attitudes. He sees this complex as an effect of interactions in the colony: “The feelings of inferiority in the colonized are correlative to the feelings of superiority in the European… Let´s have the courage to say it upright. It is the racist who creates his inferior”, he writes. Mannoni is further criticized for not considering the Malagasies´ agency and ability to choose action for their own independence.

"The Fact of Blackness" 

Chapter 5 of Black Skin, White Masks is entitled "The Fact of Blackness". In this chapter, Fanon tackles many theories. One theory he addresses is the different schemas that are said to exist within a person, and how they exist differently for Black people. He talks about one's "bodily schema" (83), and theorizes that because of both the "historical-racial schema" (84),-- one that exists because of the history of racism and makes it so there is no one bodily-schema because of the context that comes with Blackness—and one's "epidermal-racial schema" (84), -- where Black people cannot be seen for their single bodily-schema because they are seen to represent their race and the history and therefore cannot be seen past their flesh—there is no universal Black schema. He describes this experience as "no longer a question of being aware of my body in the third person but in a triple person." Fanon concludes this theorizing by saying: "As long as the black man is among his own, he will have no occasion, except in minor internal conflicts, to experience his being through others."

Fanon also addresses Ontology, stating that it "—does not permit us to understand the being of the black man" (82). He says that because Blackness was created in, and continues to exist in, negation to whiteness, that ontology is not a philosophy that can be used to understand the Black experience. Fanon states that this ontology can't be used to understand the Black experience because it ignores the "lived experience". He argues that a black man has to be black, while also being black in relation to the white man. (90)

"The Negro and Psychopathology" 

Chapter 6 of Black Skin, White Masks is entitled "The Negro and Psychopathology". In this chapter, Fanon discussed how being Black can and does affect one's psyche. He makes it clear that the treatment of Black people causes emotional trauma. Fanon argues that as a result of one's skin color being Black, Black people are unable to truly process this trauma or "make it unconscious" (466). Black people are unable to not think about the fact that they are Black and all of the historical and current stigma that come with that. Fanon's work in this chapter specifically shows the short-comings of major names in psychology such as Sigmund Freud. However, Fanon repeatedly mentions the importance of Jacques Lacan's theory of language. Fanon discusses the mental health of Black people to show that "traditional" psychology was created and founded without thinking about Black people and their experiences.

Although Fanon wrote Black Skin, White Masks while still in France, most of his work was written in North Africa. It was during this time that he produced works such as L'An Cinq, de la Révolution Algérienne in 1959 (Year Five of the Algerian Revolution), later republished as Sociology of a Revolution and later still as A Dying Colonialism. Fanon's original title was "Reality of a Nation"; however the publisher, François Maspero, refused to accept this title.

Fanon is best known for the classic analysis of colonialism and decolonization, The Wretched of the Earth. The Wretched of the Earth was first published in 1961 by Éditions Maspero, with a preface by Jean-Paul Sartre. In it Fanon analyzes the role of class, race, national culture and violence in the struggle for national liberation. The book includes an article which focuses on the ideas of violence and decolonization. He claims that decolonization is inherently a violent process, because the relationship between the settler and the native is a binary of opposites. In fact, he uses the Biblical metaphor, "The last shall be first, and the first, last", to describe the moment of decolonization. The situation of settler colonialism creates within the native a tension which grows over time and in many ways is fostered by the settler. This tension is initially released among the natives, but eventually it becomes a catalyst for violence against the settler. His work would become an academic and theoretical foundation for many revolutions.

Fanon uses the Jewish people to explain how the prejudice expressed towards blacks can not be generalized to other races or ethnicities. He discusses this in Black Skin, White Masks, and pulls from Jean-Paul Sartre's Reflections on the Jewish Question to inform his understanding of French colonialism's relationship with the Jewish people and how it can be compared and contrasted with the oppressions of Blacks across the world. In his seminal book, Fanon issues many rebuttals to Octave Mannoni's Prospero and Caliban: The Psychology of Colonization. Mannoni asserts that "colonial exploitation is not the same as other forms of exploitation, and colonial racialism is different from other kinds of racialism." Fanon responds by arguing that racism or anti-Semitism, colonial or otherwise, are not different because they rip away a person's ability to feel human. He says: "I am deprived of the possibility of being a man. I cannot disassociate myself from the future that is proposed for my brother. Every one of my acts commits me as a man. Every one of my silences, every one of my cowardices reveals me as a man." In this same vein, Fanon echoes the philosophies of Maryse Choisy, who believed that remaining neutral in times of great injustice implied unforgivable complicity. Specifically, Fanon mentions the ravages of racism and anti-Semitism because he believes that those who are one are necessarily the other as well. Yet he is careful to distinguish between the causes of the two. Fanon argues that the reasons for hating "The Jew" are born from a different fear than those for hating Blacks. Bigots are scared of Jews because they are threatened by what the Jew represents. The many tropes and stereotypes of Jewish cruelty, laziness, and cunning are the antithesis of the Western work ethic. The Black man is feared for perhaps similar traits, but the impetus is different. Essentially, "The Jew" is simply an idea, but Blacks are feared for their physical attributes. Jewishness is not easily detectable to the naked eye, but race is.

Both books established Fanon in the eyes of much of the Third World as the leading anti-colonial thinker of the 20th century.

Fanon's three books were supplemented by numerous psychiatry articles as well as radical critiques of French colonialism in journals such as Esprit and El Moudjahid.

The reception of his work has been affected by English translations which are recognized to contain numerous omissions and errors, while his unpublished work, including his doctoral thesis, has received little attention. As a result, it has been argued Fanon has often been portrayed as an advocate of violence (it would be more accurate to characterize him as a dialectical opponent of nonviolence) and that his ideas have been extremely oversimplified. This reductionist vision of Fanon's work ignores the subtlety of his understanding of the colonial system. For example, the fifth chapter of Black Skin, White Masks translates, literally, as "The Lived Experience of the Black" ("L'expérience vécue du Noir"), but Markmann's translation is "The Fact of Blackness", which leaves out the massive influence of phenomenology on Fanon's early work.

Fanon and the Lived Experiences of the Black Subject. 
In Frantz Fanon’s first book, Black Skin, White Masks, he tasks himself with exploring the experiences of the black subject. Fanon does not look at the lived experiences in the ordinary sense of the term, but rather considers a domain of experience that is rooted in the context of the world the experience takes place in. The Lived experiences of the black person is the profound sense of feeling and living through the social conditions that define a particular time and place. Fanon navigates the lived experiences of the black subject by drawing inspiration from psychoanalysis, literary texts, medical terminology, philosophy, negritude, and political consciousness. Fanon placed emphasis on the concepts of Political Consciousness and Negritude in the navigation of the experiences of black subjects.

Political Consciousness is the way in which one is crucially a part of the world and its conditions, and how one should attempt to change the world through carefully considered political projects. Political consciousness thus includes a careful consideration of facticity. These include the concrete factors that define your situation in the world, such as the actual physical environment in which you live, the place and time of birth, class membership, nationality, gender, and race, which cannot be transcended. Fanon used the concept of political consciousness to show that the field of psychological phenomena, and the experiences of the black individual, always deserve a political level of analysis.

Negritude is both the celebration of black culture and forms of expression, as well as a resistance to the politics of assimilation. Fanon is aware that the colonised individual accepts art of their white -scripted history and in some ways actively participate in it. However, he rejects the idea that human freedom and the capacity for resistance are extinguished in structurally oppressive social circumstances, such as those in which the colonized and enslaved people lived. Fanon recognises Negritudes positive reinvention of “blackness” as social reality, constructed by the oppressed for specific socio-political, emancipatory, and therapeutic aims.

In Black Skin, White Masks, Fanon echoes the concepts of Political Consciousness and Negritude by recounting the experiences of the colonised individual. The entirety of the book is a recounting of the lived experiences of a black subject. In the book Fanon places importance on the freedom and agency that the black subject maintains.

A Dying Colonialism 

A Dying Colonialism is a 1959 book by Fanon that provides an account of how, during the Algerian Revolution, the people of Algeria changed centuries-old cultural patterns and embraced certain ancient cultural practices long derided by their colonialist oppressors as “primitive,” in order to destroy those oppressors. Fanon uses the fifth year of the Algerian Revolution as a point of departure for an explication of the inevitable dynamics of colonial oppression. The militant book describes Fanon's understanding that for the colonized, “having a gun is the only chance you still have of giving a meaning to your death.” It also contains one of his most influential articles, "Unveiled Algeria", that signifies the fall of imperialism and describes how oppressed people struggle to decolonize their "mind" to avoid assimilation.

The Wretched of the Earth 

In The Wretched of the Earth (1961, Les damnés de la terre), published shortly before Fanon's death, Fanon defends the right of a colonized people to use violence to gain independence. In addition, he delineated the processes and forces leading to national independence or neocolonialism during the decolonization movement that engulfed much of the world after World War II. In defence of the use of violence by colonized peoples, Fanon argued that human beings who are not considered as such (by the colonizer) shall not be bound by principles that apply to humanity in their attitude towards the colonizer. His book was censored by the French government.

For Fanon in The Wretched of the Earth, the colonizer's presence in Algeria is based on sheer military strength. Any resistance to this strength must also be of a violent nature because it is the only "language" the colonizer speaks. Thus, violent resistance is a necessity imposed by the colonists upon the colonized. The relevance of language and the reformation of discourse pervades much of his work, which is why it is so interdisciplinary, spanning psychiatric concerns to encompass politics, sociology, anthropology, linguistics and literature.

His participation in the Algerian Front de Libération Nationale from 1955 determined his audience as the Algerian colonized. It was to them that his final work, Les damnés de la terre (translated into English by Constance Farrington as The Wretched of the Earth) was directed. It constitutes a warning to the oppressed of the dangers they face in the whirlwind of decolonization and the transition to a neo-colonialist, globalized world.

An often overlooked aspect of Fanon's work is that he did not like to physically write his pieces. Instead, he would dictate to his wife, Josie, who did all of the writing and, in some cases, contributed and edited.

Fanon, Violence and Apartheid 
In the first chapter of Fanon's book, The Wretched of the Earth he writes about violence and how this is a tool to fight against colonisation. Fanon expresses in this chapter that freedom can not be achieved if violence is not a part of the process. Fanon made this claim by arguing that the nature of colonisation was violent, in the way that black individuals were stripped of their land and treated as lesser people, so the retaliation for achieving freedom needed to be violent. Fanon argued that for colonisers to expect the colonised to achieve freedom through peaceful means was a double standard. Fanon continued to argue that there were two types of violence in a colonial setting. One, he claimed, was the violence that the colonisers had used and the counter-violence which was used by the colonised. Drawing reference to the Apartheid era in South Africa, this bookmark in history will be used as an example to express the thinking of Fanon.

Apartheid was legislation put in place by the white minority in South Africa to oppress the black majority of South Africa. The legislation was used to implement racial segregation between whites and non-whites. This practice was done through the group areas act of 1950, which eventually, along with two other acts, was known as the land acts. The land acts led to people of colour being removed from specific areas that were now considered white occupations. The acts were used to set aside 80% of the land in South Africa for the white minority. The fight against apartheid is often resembled by one major party, the ANC. During this period, many protests were organised in order to fight against the apartheid laws; however, many of these protests were met with violent retaliation from the South African police. One of the most remembered protests was the Sharpeville massacre. The Sharpeville massacre was an organised protest in retaliation to the pass law, which stated that individuals of colour were required to carry a pass in South Africa. The protest led to a total of 249 victims who were attacked by the police. Sixty-nine people of colour were killed, while 180 were injured during this protest. With protests making no progress in combating apartheid, the ANC had concluded that another method would be violence and terrorist acts, which led to the ANC forming their militant group.

In 1961 the Umkhonto we Sizwe military group was formed. The head of the group was Nelson Mandela. The first acts of violence were intended to be non-lethal, as bombings occurred in buildings related to the apartheid legislation but were empty at the time of the bombings. Later the MK group continued to commit more acts of violence to combat apartheid. The estimate states that the incident rate of violent attacks ranged from 23 incidents in 1977 to an estimated 136 incidents in 1985. During the latter half of the 1980s, the group continued to commit acts of violence in which South African citizens were killed. Fatal attacks include the church street boming of 1983, the Amanzimtoti bombing of 1985, the Magoo's Bar bombing of 1986 and the Johannesburg Magistrate Court boming of 1987. These acts of violence contrast significantly with the earlier point, which states that the ANC were reluctant to use violence in the fight against apartheid. The acts of violence also led to the ANC being branded a terrorist group by the Government.

Apartheid is mentioned in this piece on Fanon because it incorporates Fanon's philosophy on violence, showing that to break colonisation, it must be met with violence due to the nature of the oppression. Apartheid is a clear example of this as the ANC, whose initial methods were to steer away from violence; however, this had not shown any results. Instead, their non-violent protests were met with mass shootings by the South African police force. The mass shootings and killing of people of colour led to the ANC and their turn to violence to fight against apartheid and break the cycle of oppression and colonisation.

Influences
Fanon was influenced by a variety of thinkers and intellectual traditions including Jean-Paul Sartre, Lacan, Négritude, and Marxism.

Aimé Césaire was a particularly significant influence in Fanon's life. Césaire, a leader of the Négritude movement, was teacher and mentor to Fanon on the island of Martinique. Fanon was first introduced to Négritude during his lycée days in Martinique when Césaire coined the term and presented his ideas in Tropiques, the journal that he edited with Suzanne Césaire, his wife, in addition to his now classic Cahier d'un retour au pays natal  (Journal of a Homecoming). Fanon referred to Césaire's writings in his own work. He quoted, for example, his teacher at length in "The Lived Experience of the Black Man", a heavily anthologized essay from Black Skins, White Masks.

Legacy
Fanon has had an influence on anti-colonial and national liberation movements. In particular, Les damnés de la terre was a major influence on the work of revolutionary leaders such as Ali Shariati in Iran, Steve Biko in South Africa, Malcolm X in the United States and Ernesto Che Guevara in Cuba. Of these only Guevara was primarily concerned with Fanon's theories on violence; for Shariati, Biko and also Guevara the main interest in Fanon was "the new man" and "black consciousness" respectively.

With regard to the American liberation struggle more commonly known as The Black Power Movement, Fanon's work was especially influential. His book Wretched of the Earth is quoted directly in the preface of Stokely Carmichael (Kwame Ture) and Charles Hamilton's book, Black Power: The Politics of Liberation which was published in 1967, shortly after Carmichael left the Student Nonviolent Coordinating Committee (SNCC). In addition, Carmichael and Hamilton include much of Fanon's theory on Colonialism in their work, beginning by framing the situation of former slaves in America as a colony situated inside a nation. "To put it another way, there is no "American dilemma" because black people in this country form a colony, and it is not in the interest of the colonial power to liberate them" (Ture Hamilton, 5). Another example is the indictment of the black middle class or what Fanon called the "colonized intellectual" as the indoctrinated followers of the colonial power. Fanon states, "The native intellectual has clothed his aggressiveness in his barely veiled desire to assimilate himself to the colonial world" (47). A third example is the idea that the natives (African Americans) should be constructing new social systems rather than participating in the systems created by the settler population. Ture and Hamilton contend that "black people should create rather than imitate" (144).

The Black Power group that Fanon had the most influence on was the Black Panther Party (BPP). In 1970 Bobby Seale, the Chairman of the BPP, published a collection of recorded observations made while he was incarcerated entitled Seize the Time: The Story of the Black Panther Party and Huey P. Newton. This book, while not an academic text, is a primary source chronicling the history of the BPP through the eyes of one of its founders. While describing one of his first meetings with Huey P. Newton, Seale describes bringing him a copy of Wretched of the Earth. There are at least three other direct references to the book, all of them mentioning ways in which the book was influential and how it was included in the curriculum required of all new BPP members. Beyond just reading the text, Seale and the BPP included much of the work in their party platform. The Panther 10 Point Plan contained 6 points which either directly or indirectly referenced ideas in Fanon's work including their contention that there must be an end to the "robbery by the white man", and "education that teaches us our true history and our role in present day society" (67). One of the most important elements adopted by the BPP was the need to build the "humanity" of the native. Fanon claimed that the realization by the native that s/he was human would mark the beginning of the push for freedom (33). The BPP embraced this idea through the work of their Community Schools and Free Breakfast Programs.

Bolivian indianist Fausto Reinaga also had some Fanon influence and he mentions The Wretched of the Earth in his magnum opus La Revolución India, advocating for decolonisation of native South Americans from European influence. In 2015 Raúl Zibechi argued that Fanon had become a key figure for the Latin American left. In August 2021 Fanon's book Voices of liberation was one of those brought by Elisa Loncón to the new "plurinational library" of the Constitutional Convention of Chile.

Fanon's influence extended to the liberation movements of the Palestinians, the Tamils, African Americans and others. His work was a key influence on the Black Panther Party, particularly his ideas concerning nationalism, violence and the lumpenproletariat. More recently, radical South African poor people's movements, such as Abahlali baseMjondolo (meaning 'people who live in shacks' in Zulu), have been influenced by Fanon's work. His work was a key influence on Brazilian educationist Paulo Freire, as well.

Fanon has also profoundly affected contemporary African literature. His work serves as an important theoretical gloss for writers including Ghana's Ayi Kwei Armah, Senegal's Ken Bugul and Ousmane Sembène, Zimbabwe's Tsitsi Dangarembga, and Kenya's Ngũgĩ wa Thiong'o. Ngũgĩ goes so far to argue in Decolonizing the Mind (1992) that it is "impossible to understand what informs African writing" without reading Fanon's Wretched of the Earth.

The Caribbean Philosophical Association offers the Frantz Fanon Prize for work that furthers the decolonization and liberation of mankind.

Fanon's writings on black sexuality in Black Skin, White Masks have garnered critical attention by a number of academics and queer theory scholars. Interrogating Fanon's perspective on the nature of black homosexuality and masculinity, queer theory academics have offered a variety of critical responses to Fanon's words, balancing his position within postcolonial studies with his influence on the formation of contemporary black queer theory.

Fanon's legacy has expanded even further into Black Studies and more specifically, into the theories of Afro-pessimism and Black Critical Theory. Thinkers such as Sylvia Wynter, David Marriott, Frank B. Wilderson III, Jared Sexton, Calvin Warren, and Zakkiyah Iman Jackson have taken up Fanon's ontological, phenomenological, and psychoanalytic analyses of the Negro and the "zone of non-being" in order to develop theories of anti-Blackness. Putting Fanon in conversation with prominent thinkers such as Sylvia Wynter, Saidiya Hartman, and Hortense Spillers, and focusing primarily on the Charles Lam Markmann translation of Black Skin, White Masks, Black Critical Theorists and Afropessimists take seriously the ontological implications of the "Fact of Blackness" and "The Negro and Psychopathology", formulating the Black or the Slave as the non-relational, phobic object that constitutes civil society.

Fanon's writings
 Black Skin, White Masks (1952), (1967 translation by Charles Lam Markmann: New York: Grove Press)
 A Dying Colonialism (1959), (1965 translation by Haakon Chevalier: New York, Grove Press)
 The Wretched of the Earth (1961), (1963 translation by Constance Farrington: New York: Grove Weidenfeld)
 Toward the African Revolution (1964), (1969 translation by Haakon Chevalier: New York: Grove Press)
 Alienation and Freedom (2018), eds Jean Khalfa and Robert J. C. Young, revised edition (translation by Steve Corcoran: London: Bloomsbury)

Books on Fanon
 Anthony Alessandrini (ed.), Frantz Fanon: Critical Perspectives (1999, New York: Routledge)
 Gavin Arnall, Subterranean Fanon: An Underground Theory of Radical Change (2020, New York: Columbia University Press)
 Stefan Bird-Pollan, Hegel, Freud and Fanon: The Dialectic of Emancipation (2014, Lanham, Maryland: Rowman & Littlefield Publishers Inc.)
 Hussein Abdilahi Bulhan, Frantz Fanon and the Psychology Of Oppression (1985, New York: Plenum Press), 
 David Caute, Frantz Fanon (1970, London: Wm. Collins and Co.)
 Alice Cherki, Frantz Fanon. Portrait (2000, Paris: Éditions du Seuil)
 Patrick Ehlen, Frantz Fanon: A Spiritual Biography (2001, New York: Crossroad 8th Avenue), 
 Peter Geismar, Fanon (1971, Grove Press)
 Irene Gendzier, Frantz Fanon: A Critical Study (1974, London: Wildwood House), 
 Nigel C. Gibson (ed.), Rethinking Fanon: The Continuing Dialogue (1999, Amherst, New York: Humanity Books)
 Nigel C. Gibson, Fanon: The Postcolonial Imagination (2003, Oxford: Polity Press)
 Nigel C. Gibson, Fanonian Practices in South Africa (2011, London: Palgrave Macmillan)
 Nigel C. Gibson (ed.), Living Fanon: Interdisciplinary Perspectives (2011, London: Palgrave Macmillan and the University of Kwa-Zulu Natal Press)
 Nigel C. Gibson and Roberto Beneduce Frantz Fanon, Psychiatry and Politics (2017, London: Rowman and Littlefield International and The University of Witwatersrand Press)
 Lewis R. Gordon, Fanon and the Crisis of European Man: An Essay on Philosophy and the Human Sciences (1995, New York: Routledge)
 Lewis Gordon, What Fanon Said (2015, New York, Fordham) 
 Lewis R. Gordon, T. Denean Sharpley-Whiting, & Renee T. White (eds), Fanon: A Critical Reader (1996, Oxford: Blackwell)
 Peter Hudis, Frantz Fanon: Philosopher of the Barricades (2015, London: Pluto Press)
 Christopher J. Lee, Frantz Fanon: Toward a Revolutionary Humanism (2015, Athens, OH: Ohio University Press)
 David Macey, Frantz Fanon: A Biography (2012, 2nd ed., London: Verso), 
 David Marriott, Whither Fanon?: Studies in the Blackness of Being (2018, Palo Alto, Stanford UP), 
 Richard C. Onwuanibe, A Critique of Revolutionary Humanism: Frantz Fanon (1983, St. Louis: Warren Green)
 Ato Sekyi-Otu, Fanon's Dialectic of Experience (1996, Cambridge, Massachusetts: Harvard University Press)
 T. Denean Sharpley-Whiting, Frantz Fanon: Conflicts and Feminisms (1998, Lanham, Maryland: Rowman & Littlefield Publishers Inc.)
 Renate Zahar, Frantz Fanon: Colonialism and Alienation (1969, trans. 1974, Monthly Review Press)
 Alexander V. Gordon, Frantz Fanon and the Fight for National Liberation (1977, Moscow: Nauka, in Russian)

Films on Fanon
 Isaac Julien, Frantz Fanon: Black Skin White Mask (a documentary) (1996, San Francisco: California Newsreel)
 Frantz Fanon, une vie, un combat, une œuvre, a 2001 documentary
 Concerning Violence: Nine scenes from the Anti-Imperialist Self-Defense, a 2014 documentary film written and directed by Göran Olsson that is based on Frantz Fanon's essay "Concerning Violence", from his 1961 book The Wretched of the Earth.
 Luce: The main character of the movie wrote a paper about Frantz Fanon and is said to be inspired by his ideology.

See also
 By any means necessary

References

Further reading
 
 
 
 
 
 
 
 Hudis, Peter (December 2020). 2The Revolutionary Humanism of Frantz Fanon", Jacobin, 26 December 2020.
 
 Morgan, W. John and Guilherme, Alexandre, (2016), "The Contrasting Philosophies of Martin Buber and Frantz Fanon: The political in Education as dialogue or as defiance2, Diogenes, Vol. 61(1) 28–43, DOI: 10.1177/0392192115615789. First published in French in 2013.
 
 
 Shatz, Adam (January 2017). "Where Life Is Seized", London Review of Books,  Vol. 39, No. 2, pages 19–27.

External links 

 Frantz Fanon Archive at Marxists Internet Archive
 Frantz Fanon Foundation 
 Frantz Fanon: the cause of colonized peoples  (archived February 2011)
 
  Interview with Josie Fanon (Fanon's widow) in New York, November 1978 (in French and English)
 Frantz Fanon, entry in the Stanford Encyclopedia of Philosophy

 The Frantz Fanon collection which includes correspondence and manuscripts of Fanon's work is held at L'Institut mémoires de l'édition contemporaine (IMEC), in Saint-Germain-la-Blanche-Herbe, France.

 
1925 births
1961 deaths
20th-century French philosophers
20th-century French physicians
20th-century French writers
Algerian independence activists
Burials in Algeria
Caribbean emigrants
Deaths from cancer in Maryland
Deaths from leukemia
Existentialists
French Marxist historians
French Marxist writers
French Marxists
French medical writers
French military personnel of World War II
French pan-Africanists
French people of Martiniquais descent
French psychiatrists
Martiniquais people of French descent
Martiniquais philosophers
Martiniquais writers
Marxist humanists
Marxist theorists
Pan-Africanists
People from Fort-de-France
Postcolonialism
Recipients of the Croix de Guerre 1939–1945 (France)
Revolution theorists
University of Lyon alumni
Urban theorists